The National Security Service  (MEH, but known as MAH) was the governmental intelligence organization of Turkey between 1926 and 1965, when it was replaced by the National Intelligence Organization (MİT).

It was established at a time when Mustafa Kemal Atatürk was purging Committee of Union and Progress elements, including the Karakol society and Teşkilât-ı Mahsûsa ("Special Organization") intelligence organizations. The first director of the MAH was Şükrü Âli Ögel (1886–1973).

During World War II, Turkey saw increased espionage by British, Soviet, and German operatives and sympathizers. The MAH learned that Nazi Germany would not attempt to invade Turkey, allowing the İnönü administration to resist mounting Allied pressure to declare war on Germany.

The MAH received financial support from the CIA.

Notes 
  The early Turkish government named the organization MAH, without expanding the acronym, so unauthorized persons would not be able to guess what the organization was responsible for. This gave rise to incorrect backronyms such as Millî Amale Hizmeti and Millî Asayiş Hizmeti.

References

External links
 Atatürk ve Milli Amale Hizmet, Mehmet Eymür (MİT official) 

Turkish intelligence agencies
Defunct government agencies of Turkey